East Dorset is an unincorporated community and census-designated place (CDP) in the town of Dorset, Bennington County, Vermont, United States. It was first listed as a CDP prior to the 2020 census.

It is in northern Bennington County, in the eastern part of the town of Dorset, in a valley between Mount Aeolus of the Taconic Mountains to the west and the Green Mountains to the east. The Batten Kill rises at East Dorset and flows south and west to the Hudson River in New York.

U.S. Route 7 passes through East Dorset, leading north  to Rutland and south  to Bennington.

References 

Populated places in Bennington County, Vermont
Census-designated places in Bennington County, Vermont
Census-designated places in Vermont